The Arulmiku Sivan Temple is a Hindu temple located in the municipality of Glattbrugg in the Canton of Zürich in Switzerland.

History 
In the 1990s, an interreligious society was established in the canton of Zürich to support the foundation of a centre for spiritual and cultural care of Tamil people in Switzerland, as well as to preserve and maintain the Tamil culture of the approximatively 35,000 (around 20,000 in the canton of Zürich) Tamil people of Sri Lankan origin living in Switzerland. So, the Sri Sivasubramaniar Temple in Adliswil and the Arulmiku Sivan Temple in Glattbrugg were founded in 1994 as a non-profit foundation. While some 5,000 Indian Hindus in Switzerland founded their own cultural associations, but not a temple, the Tamil Hindus opened 19 houses of worship since the 1990s.

Location 
The temple was established in a pre-existing warehouse at the industry quarter between Glattbrugg and Seebach (Zürich). The Temple is located at Industriestrasse 34, 8152 Glattbrugg.

Cultural and religious life 
Poojas are celebrated twice per day, and the temple festivals attract up to 4,000 devotees and visitors.

Chor der gläubigen Bürger 

What do people in Zürich believe in? Which prayer rooms, which churches, mosques or temples do they visit? These were the questions at the beginning of a research project in Zürich's religious life. The Neumarkt Theatre developed the play Urban Prayers Zürich from this, which was performed in March 2018 in the midst of the altars and columns of the Glattbrugg Shiva Temple. Five actresses and actors from the Theater am Neumarkt and fifteen members from different religious communities – Muslims, Hindus, Jews, Orthodox, Free Churchers and also atheists – form the Chor der gläubigen Bürger (englisch: Choir of Believing Citizens). But they do not speak with one voice. The ensemble tries, often in vain, to find a voice. But as soon as one of them starts talking, the other one already has his say. They talk to each other with many tongues and then pass each other again.

See also 
 Hinduism in Switzerland
 List of Hindu temples in Switzerland

References

External links 
  

Buildings and structures in the canton of Zürich
Hindu temples in Switzerland
Tamil culture
Shiva temples
Religious buildings and structures completed in 1992
1992 establishments in Switzerland
Opfikon
20th-century architecture in Switzerland